Alethse de la Torre Rosas is a Mexican physician and infectious diseases specialist.   Since 2018 she has been Director General of the National Center for the Prevention and Control of HIV / AIDS.

Education 
She earned a medical degree National Autonomous University of Mexico, and a master's degree in public health from London School of Hygiene and Tropical Medicine. She was advisor to the Pan American Health Organization (PAHO). She is a professor at Universidad La Salle México, and Panamerican University.

References 

Year of birth missing (living people)
Living people
Mexican healthcare managers
HIV/AIDS in Mexico
Alumni of the London School of Hygiene & Tropical Medicine
National Autonomous University of Mexico alumni
Mexican women physicians
Health officials